The World Peace Prayer Society (WPPS) is a non-sectarian pacifist organization. Its motto is "May Peace Prevail on Earth".

WPPS was founded in 1955 by Masahisa Goi in Japan. The organization is commonly known through its Peace Pole Project.

In 1990, the Society was accepted as a Non-Governmental Organization (NGO) in affiliation with the United Nations Department of Public Information.

World Peace Sanctuary 
The World Peace Sanctuary is the international home of the World Peace Prayer Society. Nestled in the foothills of the Berkshire Mountains, the site occupies  located in Wassaic, New York two hours north of New York City.

The Sanctuary serves as home to annual events, including the World Peace Festival, Earth Day Peace Fair, Thanksgiving for the Earth, Honoring Dr. Martin Luther King Jr. and Planet Peace Day for school children.

External links

Peace organizations based in the United States